Cecil Edward Espy (born January 20, 1963) is an American former professional baseball outfielder. He played in Major League Baseball for the Los Angeles Dodgers, Texas Rangers, Pittsburgh Pirates, and Cincinnati Reds in 1983 and 1987-1993.

Career
Espy was a first-round pick of the Chicago White Sox in the 1980 Major League Baseball draft, the eighth player chosen, ahead of such other first-round picks as Terry Francona and Billy Beane. He was traded in the spring of 1982 to the Los Angeles Dodgers for outfielder Rudy Law.

Making his big-league debut at age 20 on Sept. 2, 1983 with the Dodgers as a late-season call-up, Espy appeared in 11 games. He then had to wait until 1987 to return to the majors.

His best season came with the Texas Rangers in 1987, playing every day, batting .257 and stealing 49 bases. Espy was released by the Cincinnati Reds in 1993.

In 546 games over eight seasons, Espy posted a .244 batting average (304-for-1248) with 160 runs, 7 home runs, 108 RBI and 103 stolen bases. He recorded a .976 fielding percentage as an outfielder.

References

External links

Baseball Almanac

1963 births
Living people
African-American baseball players
American expatriate baseball players in Mexico
Appleton Foxes players
Baseball players from San Diego
Buffalo Bisons (minor league) players
Cincinnati Reds players
Gulf Coast White Sox players
Guerreros de Oaxaca players
Hawaii Islanders players
Indianapolis Indians players
Los Angeles Dodgers players
Major League Baseball center fielders
Oklahoma City 89ers players
Pittsburgh Pirates players
San Antonio Dodgers players
San Bernardino Spirit players
Texas Rangers players
Vero Beach Dodgers players
American expatriate baseball players in Taiwan
Jungo Bears players
21st-century African-American people
20th-century African-American sportspeople
Point Loma High School alumni